"Give Me His Last Chance" is a song written and recorded by American country music artist Lionel Cartwright. It was released in June 1989 as the third single from the album Lionel Cartwright.  The song reached number three on the Billboard Hot Country Singles & Tracks chart.

Music video
The music video was directed by Stephen Buck and premiered in mid 1989.

Chart performance
"Give Me His Last Chance" debuted on the U.S. Billboard Hot Country Singles & Tracks for the week of June 17, 1989.

Year-end charts

References

1989 singles
Lionel Cartwright songs
Song recordings produced by Tony Brown (record producer)
Songs written by Lionel Cartwright
MCA Records singles
1989 songs